Philaccolus is a genus of beetles in the family Dytiscidae, containing the following species:

 Philaccolus elongatus (Régimbart, 1903)
 Philaccolus lepidus Guignot, 1949
 Philaccolus lineatoguttatus (Régimbart, 1894)
 Philaccolus ondoi Bilardo & Rocchi, 1990
 Philaccolus orthogrammus (Régimbart, 1895)

References

Dytiscidae